QA/QC is the combination of quality assurance, the process or set of processes used to measure and assure the quality of a product, and quality control, the process of ensuring products and services meet consumer expectations.

Quality assurance is process oriented and focuses on defect prevention, while quality control is product oriented and focuses on defect identification.

See also
 Project management
 Quality management

References

External links
 McVittie, L. Quality Assurance vs Quality Control" Patient Guard, Ltd. Retrieved 22 February 2022.

Quality control
Quality assurance
Quality